Lasiopetalum monticola is a species of flowering plant in the family Malvaceae and is endemic to the south-west of Western Australia. It is an erect, slender or straggling shrub with densely hairy branchlets, leaves and flowers, egg-shaped leaves and pink, cream-coloured or white flowers.

Description
Flowering occurs from August to October.<ref name="FloraBase">{{FloraBase|name=Lasiopetalum monticola|id=11010}}</ref>

TaxonomyLasiopetalum monticola was first formally described in 1974 by Susan Paust in the journal Nuytsia from specimens collected from Ellen Peak in the Stirling Range by Alexander Morrison in 1902.  The specific epithet (monticola) means "a dweller in mountains".

Distribution and habitat
This lasiopetalum grows on steep slopes and gullies on rocky soil in the Stirling Range and on East Mount Barren in the Esperance Plains and Mallee biogeographic regions of south-western Western Australia.

Conservation statusLasiopetalum monticola'' is listed as "Priority Three" by the Government of Western Australia Department of Biodiversity, Conservation and Attractions, meaning that it is poorly known and known from only a few locations but is not under imminent threat.

References

monticola
Malvales of Australia
Rosids of Western Australia
Plants described in 1974